Joseph Eve (July 17, 1784 – June 16, 1843) was an American politician and diplomat. He was born in Culpeper County, Virginia. As a young man he moved to Knox County, Kentucky. He married Betsey Withers Ballinger in 1811; they had no children. He was a lawyer in Kentucky and was elected to the Kentucky House of Representatives three times. He was a colonel in the United States Army during the War of 1812, and later served four years as a senator in the Kentucky Senate. He was a circuit court judge for a period of ten years.

On April 15, 1841, Eve was appointed to post of Chargé d'affaires for the United States mission to the Republic of Texas. He was a strong advocate of U.S. annexation of the then-independent Republic. During this time, conflict between Texas and Mexico grew, and the provisional Republic seat of government was relocated several times. Eve moved his legation to Galveston, Texas, hoping to benefit from the climate, as his tuberculosis was getting worse. However, in early June 1843, he was released from his assignment, succeeded by William Sumter Murphy, on June 16. The same day, Eve died of tuberculosis, after which his widow relocated to their residence in Kentucky.

References

External links
 
 letters and biography of Joseph Eve
 letters from Eve to Sam Houston
 letters from Eve

1784 births
1843 deaths
Ambassadors of the United States to the Republic of Texas
Kentucky state senators
Members of the Kentucky House of Representatives
Kentucky lawyers
United States Army colonels
United States Army personnel of the War of 1812
People from Culpeper County, Virginia
People from Knox County, Kentucky
19th-century American politicians
19th-century American lawyers